The Milenio Cartel, or Cártel de los Valencia (Valencia family Cartel), was a Mexican criminal organization based in Michoacán. It relocated to Jalisco in the early 2000s. The Jalisco New Generation Cartel was born from the splintering of the Milenio Cartel.

History

The Milenio cartel first appeared in the late 1970s when the Valencia family, an avocado farmer family from Tamaulipas, started to grow cannabis and opium poppy in Jalisco and Michoacan and began selling these drugs to bigger cartels. By the mid 1990s they had close connections with Colombian traffickers like Fabio Ochoa Vásquez of the Medellin cartel and by the early 2000s they were working with synthetic drugs provided by Zhenli Ye Gon. By this time the cartel had taken several hits from the government, like the 2003 capture of their leader Armando Valencia Cornelio. In order to protect their structure the new leader, Óscar Orlando Nava Valencia, associated with the Sinaloa cartel, the Milenio cartel became a branch of what was known as the Sinaloa federation, under the direct orders of Ignacio Coronel Villarreal.

Luis Valencia Valencia and Óscar Nava Valencia took control of the cartel after the arrest of Armando Valencia Cornelio on August 15, 2003. The cartel operated in at least six Mexican states: Michoacán, Colima, Jalisco, Mexico City, Nuevo León and Tamaulipas, where it produced marijuana and heroin. Another relative and close associate was Oscar Nava Valencia.

On October 28, 2009, Oscar Nava Valencia (El Lobo) was captured after a gun battle with Mexican Army troops in the municipality of Tlajomulco de Zuniga, Jalisco. Oscar Nava and his brother, Juan Nava Valencia, were responsible for the planning and smuggling of cocaine shipments from South and Central America to the port of Manzanillo, Colima from where it was smuggled into the United States.

After the arrest of Oscar Nava Valencia, his brother Juan Carlos Nava Valencia took over the leadership of the Milenio cartel until May 6, 2010 when he was arrested in Guadalajara during an operation by the Mexican Army.

Fracture 
With the 2009 capture of Óscar Nava Valencia, leader of the Milenio cartel, and the death of Ignacio Coronel Villarreal, of the Sinaloa cartel federation, a power vacuum emerged. The Milenio broke into smaller factions, most notably La Resistencia, headed by Ramiro Pozos El Molca, and the Jalisco New Generation Cartel (CJNG), headed by Nemesio Oseguera El Mencho, and started a turf war for the control of the region.

La Resistencia formed a brief alliance with Los Zetas, the CJNG reunited with the Sinaloa cartel, and other remnants of the milenio that splintered from the Sinaloa Cartel went independent and reached a working agreement with La Familia Michoacana. However, when la Familia was disbanded in 2011, the Milenio Cartel relocated to Guadalajara and forged a loose alliance with a faction of Los Zetas Cartel. Although some Valencia/Milenio factions were at war with the CJNG, the core of the Valencia family is related with El Mencho, the CJNG leader, due to El Mencho's wife being a Valencia, the remnants of the Milenio gang currently form under the CJNG wing known as "Los Cuinis".

On January 29, 2011, Oscar Nava Valencia was extradited to the United States to face charges of conspiracy and drug trafficking in the Southern District of Texas. He was sentenced to 25 years in prison on January 8, 2014.

See also 
 Mexican Drug War
 Mérida Initiative
 War on Drugs
 Avocado production in Mexico

References

Organizations established in 1999
1999 establishments in Mexico
Organizations disestablished in 2012
2012 disestablishments in Mexico
Disbanded Mexican drug cartels
Mexican drug war
Transnational organized crime
Organized crime groups in the United States
Gangs in California
Gangs in Maryland
Gangs in North Carolina
Gangs in Oregon
Gangs in Texas